Oak Hill is a city in Volusia County, Florida, United States. The population was 1,792 at the 2010 census.

History

The first inhabitants of what would become Oak Hill were the Timucuan Indians, who lived along the shore from c. 2000 BCE to 1500 CE, when European settlers started to arrive. In 1564, the French illustrator, Jacques LeMoyne, made a map showing an Indian village named Surruque el Viejo near el Baradero de Suroc. The name "Oak Hill" seems to have been first used by seasonal northern loggers c. 1850.

Florida became a state in 1845, and British and American permanent settlers started to arrive. They began to displace the various tribes, including the Seminoles, who fought back. One Seminole War raid in 1856 resulted in four deaths. A resident, Arad Shelton, took their bodies north to New Smyrna Beach by wagon.

By the Civil War, Oak Hill had a salt works, some part-time stores, and the first orange groves had been planted (by a Mr. Mitchell). Oak Hill also has Civil War veterans buried in the local cemetery: five who fought for the Union, and six who fought for the Confederacy.

Hotels, stores, a post office, and a school operated by Rev. Wicks in the Congregational church served a few white students in the morning and several black students in the afternoon. A public school for white students was constructed in the early 1890s, and a prominent black freedman, Bill Williams, provided instruction and space for black students in 1901. A public school for black students was constructed in 1927.

In 1924, a grade 1 through 10 school was built on Ridge Road, just to the east of Dixie Highway (now US-1), which was paved the same year. This building was replaced in 1960 by a new structure, which eventually became the W.F. Burns Elementary School. In 2008, the county school board closed the school (citing budget cuts) and slated it for demolition. County work crews stripped the facility of anything of value.

The non-profit Oak Hill Community Trust, with the assistance and guidance of local architect Sid Corhern, Tom Gibbs, and many, many other concerned citizens purchased the property from the county school board in late 2009. A charter school operator was contacted and after voluminous paperwork, was approved in January 2011.

Beginning in September 2010, hundreds of volunteers gave thousands of hours of their time to refurbish the buildings. They did plumbing, electrical, painting, landscaping and much more, often with donated materials. The school opened in August 2011, with 260 students enrolled.

In 2012, Kennedy Space Center donated a surplus 10,000 square foot office building to the school, on condition that it had to be moved from KSC without delay. Again, volunteers stepped forward and the building was delivered (in eight sections) to the site, reassembled, refurbished as classrooms, and is now in use.

The school is a STEM (Science, Technology, Engineering, Math) school, and after only two years of operation, has already achieved a "B" rating. As of 2014, there are 385 students in grades K through 8, many are local, and some come from as far away as Ormond Beach and Orange City.

In the past, citrus growing and commercial fishing were the primary income sources for residents of Oak Hill. A series of hard freezes, cold snaps and the advent of citrus canker have greatly reduced the number of citrus groves, and by 1995 the State of Florida's Gill Net Ban eliminated most of the fishing business. There are several fish, clam and oyster farms in operation.

There is a significant amount of recreational fishing and eco-tourism, and Oak Hill is one terminus for the Florida "River of Lakes" scenic highway. Several regional bicycle paths traverse Oak Hill, and seeing groups of dozens of recreational touring cyclists is quite common. East of the town's center, on the edge of Mosquito Lagoon is Seminole Rest National Historic Site, part of Canaveral National Seashore.

Oak Hill has been designated as an "Enterprise Zone" by the State of Florida. There are various tax rebates and incentives available to new businesses locating here and for the expansion of exiting businesses. City government is "business friendly" with a very low paperwork burden for businesses and minimal license fees. Additionally, business owners over the age of 65 get or renew their city licenses for free.

The City of Oak Hill was first chartered in 1927. Local government was based on a Mayor-Commission, with each commissioner functioning as head of a municipal department. The city was disbanded in 1930. The country was in a depression, and the city petitioned the government to inactivate the charter, which was granted. The city later petitioned the government in 1962 to reactivate the charter.

Clarence Goodrich was the city's mayor from 1963 to 1989, the longest term any mayor has held in the state of Florida. Bobby Greatrex was mayor from 1989 to 1990, and Bruce Burch served from 1990 to 1994. Toreatha Wood became the city's first female mayor, as well as first African-American female mayor, serving from 1999 to 2000. Darry Evans was the first African American male mayor. Lorna Travis was mayor from 2000 to 2001, Susan Cook was mayor from 2001 to 2002, and Bob Jackson was mayor in 2002. Mayor Darla Lauer resigned for personal reasons, and was replaced by Mary Lee Cook. The current mayor is Douglas Gibson, who was elected in November 2012.

On the evening of August 1, 2011, the city commission voted to disband the city's police department due to ongoing acrimony, personality conflicts and policy disagreements between the city commissioners and the police department. All nine employees received unemployment benefits. The Volusia County Sheriff's Department assumed law enforcement duties for the city.

Geography

Oak Hill is a city on the Atlantic coastline of Volusia County.

Demographics

As of the census of 2000, there were 1,378 people, 549 households, and 410 families residing in the city. The racial makeup of the city was 81.79% White, 16.26% African American, 0.65% Native American, 0.22% Asian, 0.51% from other races, and 0.58% from two or more races. Hispanic or Latino of any race were 0.65% of the population.

The 2010 Census shows 1,792 people (an increase of 30% since 2000) and 1,044 dwelling units, with 247 dwellings vacant, vacant for rent or vacant for sale. There were 797 households in the city, 638 of which were owner occupied dwellings (total population of 1,418 people, or 2.2 people per household). Population density in 2010 is 271.5 people per square mile (up from 216.1 per square mile in 2000). Note that this number is not precise because the area of the city has increased somewhat since 2000 through annexations.

The 2010 racial makeup of the city shows only small changes from 2000, White is 83.15% (from 81.79% in 2000), African American is 13.89% (from 16.26% in 2000), all other ethnicities combined total just under 3%.

Of the 549 (in 2000) households, 25.3% had children under the age of 18 living with them, 60.3% were married couples living together, 8.9% had a female householder with no husband present, and 25.3% were non-families. 20.6% of all households were made up of individuals, and 10.2% had someone living alone who was 65 years of age or older. The average household size was 2.51 and the average family size was 2.84.

In the city, the population was spread out, with 22.1% under the age of 18, 6.9% from 18 to 24, 24.6% from 25 to 44, 25.4% from 45 to 64, and 21.0% who were 65 years of age or older. The median age was 42 years. For every 100 females, there were 106.9 males. For every 100 females age 18 and over, there were 104.0 males.

The median income for a household in the city was $32,130, and the median income for a family was $35,682. Males had a median income of $24,643 versus $22,917 for females. The per capita income for the city was $16,158. About 7.8% of families and 14.4% of the population were below the poverty line, including 25.0% of those under age 18 and 6.8% of those age 65 or over.

References

External links

 City of Oak Hill official website

Populated coastal places in Florida on the Atlantic Ocean
Cities in Volusia County, Florida
Populated places established in 1927
Cities in Florida